Strength of a Woman is the thirteenth studio album by American R&B singer-songwriter Mary J. Blige. It was released on April 28, 2017, by Capitol Records. The album serves as the follow-up to her twelfth studio album The London Sessions (2014). Strength of a Woman is predominantly a R&B and hip hop soul album. Blige worked with producers and songwriters such as DJ Camper, Brandon "B.A.M." Hodge, Hit-Boy, Jazmine Sullivan, Lamb, Bigg D, Neff-U, Kaytranada, and BadBadNotGood on the album. It also features guest appearances by Kanye West, Quavo, DJ Khaled, Missy Elliott, Prince Charlez, Kaytranada, and BadBadNotGood.

The album debuted at number three on the US Billboard 200 chart, selling 78,000 album-equivalent units in its first week. It attained international charting and produced five official singles: "Thick of It", "U + Me (Love Lesson)", "Love Yourself" featuring Kanye West, "Set Me Free", and "Glow Up" featuring Quavo, DJ Khaled, and Missy Elliott, with the former two singles peaking atop the US Adult R&B Songs chart. Upon its release, Strength of a Woman received generally positive reviews from music critics. Blige embarked on the Strength of a Woman Tour in support of the album from April 2, 2017 to September 9, 2017.

Singles
"Thick of It" was released as the lead single on October 7, 2016. The song topped the US Adult R&B Songs chart for a record-breaking 16 consecutive weeks. Its music video, directed by Dennis Leupold, premiered on November 7, 2016 on her YouTube account. "U + Me (Love Lesson)" was released on February 17, 2017 and also topped the US Adult R&B Songs Chart. "Love Yourself" was released as the third single on March 30, 2017. The music video for the official remix of "Love Yourself" featuring Harlem rapper ASAP Rocky premiered via Complex on May 26, 2017. It was directed by Taj and was shot in Los Angeles and New York City. "Set Me Free" was released as the fourth official single on July 19, 2017.

Critical reception

Strength of a Woman received generally positive reviews from music critics. On Metacritic, which assigns a normalized rating out of 100 to reviews from critics, the album received an average score of 74, based on seven reviews. Jon Caramanica of The New York Times gave the album a positive review, stating that, "the album moves like a forest fire: ruthless, wide-ranging, and blunt." Matt Bauer of Exclaim! praised the lyrics, and called it Blige's best work in over a decade, but criticizing songs such as "Glow Up", and "Smile". In a positive review, Julianne Shepherd of Pitchfork considered the album a relief from Blige's previous album, The London Sessions, along with Blige sticking to what makes her unique. In a positive review, Andy Kellman of AllMusic gave the album 3.5 stars, calling some of the songs clichéd, however, praising the anthems on the album. Kate Hutchinson of The Guardian gave a mixed review of the album, criticizing the song "Glow Up", calling it too similar to other artists such as Rihanna, and Beyoncé. Despite these complaints, she praised the anthems included on the album. In another mixed review, Andy Gill of The Independent found the album using a generic R&B theme, however, stating that some songs included on the album are able to do it well, such as "Set Me Free".

Commercial performance
Strength of a Woman debuted at number three on the US Billboard 200 on the issue dated ending May 20, 2017, with 78,000 album-equivalent units, (including 72,000 standard copies) in its first week. It became Blige's highest-charting album since 2009's Stronger with Each Tear, her tenth top five entry, and thirteenth top ten album on the chart. The album marked a significant spike of sales for the singer, whose previous release The London Sessions (2014) had opened at number nine, with first week sales of 55,000 copies. The album also debuted at number two on the US Top R&B/Hip-Hop Albums chart and number one on the Top R&B Albums charts, respectively.

Track listing

Personnel
Credits for Strength of a Woman adapted from AllMusic.

Miguel Atwood-Ferguson – conductor, harp arrangement, soloist, string arrangements
Derrick Baker – composition
Derrick "Bigg D" Baker – guitar
Vincent Berry – composition
Alison Bjorkedal – harp
Mary J. Blige – composition, executive production, vocals
David D. Brown – composition, production, backing vocals
Gerry Brown – string engineering
Marshall Bryant – engineering
Caroline Buckman – viola
Richard Butler – composition
Daniel Caesar – backing vocals
Darhyl "DJ" Camper Jr. – composition, drums, fender rhodes, organ, piano, production
Paul Cartwright – violin
Louis Celestin – composition
Louis Kevin Celestin – drums, percussion, synthesizer bass
Maddox Chhim – assistance
Thomas Cullison – assistance
Eric Dawkins – composition
Ayanna Depas – assistance
DJ Khaled – vocals
Aaron Draper – percussion
Missy Elliott – composition, vocals
Davion Farris – composition, engineering
Theron Feemster – composition, production
Eddie "A&R Eddie" Fourcell – A&R
Vanessa Freebairn-Smith – cello
Michael Frenke – engineering
Yesseh Furaha-Ali – alto sax
John Goodison – composition
Eric Gorfain – violin
Cameron Graham – engineering
Chester Hansen – composition, synthesizer
Jaymz Hardy-Martin III – engineering, mixing, vocal mixing
Charles Hinshaw – composition
Dave Hoddell – composition
Spike Hoddell – composition
Brandon Hodge – composition
Brandon "B.A.M." Hodge – composition, production
Chauncey Hollis – composition
Jean-Marie Horvat – mixing
Elizabeth Isik – A&R
Peter Jacobson – cello
Hotae Alexander Jang – string engineering
Jaycen Joshua – mixing
Cortni Elisa Jordan – composition
Leah Katz – viola
Kaytranada – vocals
David Kim – assistance, mixing assistance
Steven "Q-Beatz" Kubie – programming
Marisa Kuney – violin
Dave Kutch – mastering
Cainon Lamb – composition
Songa Lee – violin
Dennis Leupold – photography
Timothy Loo – cello
Quavious Marshall – composition
Lucia Micarelli – violin
David Nakaji – assistance
Dwayne Nesmith – composition
Jon Nettlesbey – assistance
Tremaine Neverson – composition
Prince Charlez – vocals
Quavo – vocals
Dexter Randall – assistance
Frank Rein – trombone
Wendell Kelly - trombone
Priscilla Renea – composition
Teddy Riley – production
Elese Teyonie Russell – composition
Stuart Schenk – mixing
Ashton Simmonds – composition
Mary Kathleen Sloan – violin
Alexander Sowinski – clapping, composition, piano
Dexter Story – contractor
Jazmine Sullivan – composition, backing vocals
Jenny Takamatsu – violin
Matthew Tavares – composition, engineering
Gavin Taylor – art direction, design
Thomas Lea – viola
Sergio "Sergical" Tsai – engineering
William Tyler – composition
Ina Veli – violin
Phil Wainman – composition
Kanye West – composition, vocals
Eric Whatley – bass
Chris Woods – violin
Kevin Woods – flugelhorn, trumpet
Benjamin Wright – composition, horn arrangements, string arrangements

Charts

Weekly charts

Year-end charts

References

2017 albums
Capitol Records albums
Mary J. Blige albums
Albums produced by Hit-Boy
Albums produced by Kaytranada
Albums produced by BadBadNotGood